Epigraph may refer to:

 An inscription, as studied in the archeological sub-discipline of epigraphy
 Epigraph (literature), a phrase, quotation, or poem that is set at the beginning of a document or component
 Epigraph (mathematics), the set of points lying on or above the graph of a function
 Epigraphs (album), an album by Ketil Bjørnstad and David Darling

See also
 Epigram (disambiguation)